The 1934 Big Ten Conference football season was the 39th season of college football played by the member schools of the Big Ten Conference (also known as the Western Conference) and was a part of the 1934 college football season.

The 1934 Minnesota Golden Gophers football team, under head coach Bernie Bierman, compiled an undefeated 8–0 record, won the Big Ten championship, led the conference in scoring offense (33.8 points per game), and was selected as the national champion by eight of the selectors recognized as official by the NCAA. Fullback Pug Lund received the Chicago Tribune Silver Football as the most valuable player of the Big Ten. Three Minnesota players were selected as consensus first-team All-Americans: Lund, end Frank Larson, and guard Bill Bevan.

The 1934 Illinois Fighting Illini football team, under head coach Robert Zuppke, compiled a 7–1 record and was ranked No. 4 under the Dickinson System. The lone setback was a 7-3 loss at Wisconsin. Halfback Bud Lindberg was selected as the team's most valuable player. Quarterback Jack Beynon was selected as a first-team All-Big Ten player.

The 1934 Ohio State Buckeyes football team, in the program's first year under Francis Schmidt, compiled a 7–1 record, led the Big Ten in scoring defense (4.3 points allowed per game), and was ranked No. 8 under the Dickinson System. Guard Regis Monahan and end Merle Wendt were selected as first-team All-Americans.

Season overview

Results and team statistics

Key
DS = Rankings from Dickinson System. See 1934 college football season
PPG = Average of points scored per game
PAG = Average of points allowed per game
MVP = Most valuable player as voted by players on each team as part of the voting process to determine the winner of the Chicago Tribune Silver Football trophy

Regular season

Bowl games
No Big Ten teams participated in any bowl games during the 1934 season.

All-Big Ten players

The following players were picked by the Associated Press (AP) and/or the United Press (UP)  as first-team players on the 1934 All-Big Ten Conference football team.

All-Americans

Two Big Ten players were selected as consensus first-team players on the 1934 College Football All-America Team. They were:

Other Big Ten players received first-team honors from at least one selector. They were:

References